Torn Arteries is the seventh studio album by British death metal band Carcass. It was released on 17 September 2021. Named after a demo tape recorded by former Carcass drummer Ken Owen, this is the band's first album in eight years after its predecessor Surgical Steel (2013). It also marked the first time since 1993's Heartwork that Carcass had recorded more than one album with the same lineup – bassist and vocalist Jeff Walker, Bill Steer and drummer Daniel Wilding. Torn Arteries was initially scheduled to be released on 7 August 2020, but the COVID-19 pandemic caused the album to be delayed for over a year.

Accolades

Year-end lists

Track listing

Personnel
 Jeff Walker – bass, lead vocals
 Bill Steer – guitars, backing vocals
 Daniel Wilding – drums, additional vocals

Charts

References

2021 albums
Albums postponed due to the COVID-19 pandemic
Carcass (band) albums
Nuclear Blast albums